The Medal of Honor was created during the American Civil War and is the highest military decoration presented by the United States government to a member of its armed forces. The recipient must have distinguished himself at the risk of his own life above and beyond the call of duty in action against an enemy of the United States. Due to the nature of this medal, it is commonly presented posthumously.
Of the 3,515 Medals of Honor awarded as of 2023, 36 have been awarded to Asian-American recipients. 

The first Asian/Pacific Islander to receive the Medal was James Smith, a native Hawaiian, who was awarded the medal in 1872 in peacetime. The first Asian-American Medal of Honor recipient was Charles J. Simons, who was awarded the Medal of Honor in 1896 for his actions in the Battle of the Crater in 1864 during the American Civil War.

In 1996, a study determined that Asian Pacific Americans were discriminated against in the awarding of medals during World War II; consequently, 22 had their medals upgraded to the Medal of Honor. Except for those awarded during the 1996 discrimination study the most recent Asian-American recipient of the Medal of Honor was Rodney Yano, who received it for his actions during the Vietnam War. 

In 2022, President Joe Biden awarded four Medal of Honors to Vietnam War veterans, two of which are Asian-American veterans Edward N. Kaneshiro and Dennis Fujii, the first awarded to Asian-American soldiers in 26 years (since 1996). 

Dennis Fujii is the only currently living Asian-American Medal of Honor recipient as of 2023.

American Civil War and peacetime
James Smith was the first person of Asian/Pacific Islander descent to be awarded the Medal of Honor, awarded to him in 1872.

Sergeant Charles J. Simons, an Indian-American, was the first person of Asian descent to be awarded the Medal of Honor. Simons was awarded the Medal of Honor in 1896 for his actions during the Siege of Petersburg in 1864.

Philippine–American War and peacetime
The Philippine–American War was an armed military conflict between the United States and the First Philippine Republic, fought between 1899 and least 1902, which arose from a Filipino political struggle against U.S. occupation of the Philippines. Although the conflict was officially declared over on July 4, 1902, American troops continued hostilities against remnants of the Philippine Army and other resistance groups until 1913, and some historians consider these unofficial extensions part of the war.

During this conflict one Asian American, José Nísperos, received the Medal of Honor for continuing to fight after being seriously wounded.

Telesforo Trinidad received a Medal of Honor after rescuing two men from a boiler explosion and was the second and last Asian-American serviceman to receive the Medal during peacetime.

World War II
World War II, or the Second World War, was a global military conflict, the joining of what had initially been two separate conflicts. The first began in Asia in 1937 as the Second Sino-Japanese War; the other began in Europe in 1939 with the German invasion of Poland. This global conflict split the majority of the world's nations into two opposing military alliances: the Allies and the Axis powers. It involved the mobilization of over 100 million military personnel, making it the most widespread war in history, and placed the participants in a state of total war, erasing the distinction between civil and military resources. This resulted in the complete activation of a nation's economic, industrial, and scientific capabilities for the purposes of the war effort. Over 60 million people, the majority of them civilians, were killed, making it the deadliest conflict in human history. The Allies were victorious, and, as a result, the United States and Soviet Union emerged as the world's two leading superpowers.

During this conflict 464 United States military personnel received the Medal of Honor, 266 of them posthumously. By the end of the war, only two Asian Americans had been awarded the Medal of Honor, Sergeant Jose Calugas of the Philippine Scouts and Private Sadao S. Munemori of the 442nd Regimental Combat Team. A 1996 study commissioned by the United States Army by order of Congress investigated racial discrimination in the awarding of medals during World War II. The Command History Office at the Defense Language Institute Foreign Language Center at the Presidio of Monterey, California was tasked with identifying affected service-members and reviewing the records. After performing a review of the files, the study recommended that several Asian Americans and Pacific Islanders who received the Distinguished Service Cross during World War II should be upgraded to the Medal of Honor. On June 21, 2000, President Bill Clinton awarded the Medal to 22 Asian Americans, 21 from the aforementioned study, in a ceremony at the White House.

Of the 24 Asian-American awardees, 21 earned the Medal while serving with the 442nd Regimental Combat Team or its component unit, the 100th Infantry Battalion, making the 442nd the most decorated regiment-sized unit of the war. Only two Asian-American officers received the Medal of Honor during World War II: Captain Francis B. Wai who received it for drawing enemy fire to himself to reveal their positions and Second Lieutenant Daniel Inouye who received his medal for destroying two machine gun nests and continuing to fight after being wounded. Inouye became the first U.S. Representative for Hawaii and the first Japanese American congressman; he served as one of Hawaii's U.S. senators from 1963 continuously until his death in 2012.

Korean War
The Korean War was a three year conflict that began with the North Korean invasion of South Korea following clashes along the border. In a narrow sense, some may refer to it as a civil war, though each side was supported by international actors. After failing to strengthen their cause in the free elections held in South Korea during May 1950 and the refusal of South Korea to hold new elections per North Korean demands, the communist North Korean Army moved south on June 25, 1950 to attempt to reunite the Korean peninsula, which had been formally divided since 1948. The conflict was then expanded by the United States and the Soviet Union's involvement as part of the larger Cold War. The main hostilities were during the period from June 25, 1950 until the armistice was signed on July 27, 1953. In the early stages of the war, President Harry Truman sometimes described the conflict under the aegis of the United Nations as a "police action" rather than use the term war.

Three Asian Americans received the Medal of Honor for their actions during the Korean War. Hiroshi H. Miyamura was captured by Chinese forces and held as a prisoner of war for 28 months. For his protection, news of his Medal of Honor award was classified until his release from captivity.

Vietnam War
The Vietnam War, also known as the Second Indochina War, and in Vietnam as “the war against America”, occurred from 1959 to April 30, 1975. The term Vietnam Conflict is often used to refer to events which took place between 1959 and April 30, 1975. The war was fought between the Communist-supported Democratic Republic of Vietnam and the United States supported Republic of Vietnam. It concluded with the defeat and failure of the United States foreign policy in Vietnam. On April 30, 1975, the capital of South Vietnam, Saigon fell to the communist forces of North Vietnam, effectively ending the Vietnam War. Over 8.7 million U.S. forces participated in the Vietnam War; of whom slightly over 47,000 were killed in battle and almost 11,000 more died of non-battle causes.

During the Vietnam War, five Asian Americans received the Medal of Honor, four of them posthumously. Elmelindo Smith, although wounded multiple times was killed while fighting with his unit. Terry Kawamura sacrificed his life by jumping on an explosive charge, saving the lives of two other soldiers, and Rodney Yano sacrificed his life by throwing burning ammunition off of a helicopter after a grenade exploded prematurely. Edward N. Kaneshiro died less than a year after his Medal of Honor action in 1967 and did not receive the Medal until 2022, posthumously. 

Dennis Fujii is the only living Asian-American Vietnam War veteran to be awarded the Medal of Honor in person. Fujii is also the only living Asian-American Medal of Honor recipient.

See also
Military history of Asian Americans

Footnotes

References

Lists of Medal of Honor recipients
Medal of Honor
Medal of Honor